Roztoky is a town in Prague-West District in the Central Bohemian Region of the Czech Republic. It has about 8,600 inhabitants.

Geography
Roztoky is located north of Prague, in the Prague Plateau. The town lies on the left bank of the Vltava River, in its meander.

History
According to archaeological findings, the area of Roztoky was inhabited continuously from the early Stone Age to the early Middle Ages. The first written mention of Roztoky is found in the ruling charter from 1233, in which Peter of Roztoky was mentioned.

Demographics

Sights

Levý Hradec is a locality in Roztoky with remains of a Slavic gord founded by the Přemyslid dynasty. In the 980s, Bořivoj I, Duke of Bohemia had the first Christian church in Bohemia built here, dedicated to Saint Clement. The church is preserved, but has been rebuilt and expanded many times, and only the foundations of the rotunda under the floor are preserved from the original church.

Notable people
Zdenka Braunerová (1858–1934), painter and graphic designer
Emil Utitz (1883–1956), philosopher and psychologist
Jiří Srnec (1931–2021), theatre director and artist
Lubomír Beneš (1935–1995), animator, director and author; lived and died here

Twin towns – sister cities

Roztoky is twinned with:
 Skawina, Poland

References

External links

Central Bohemian Museum
Levý Hradec website

Cities and towns in the Czech Republic
Populated places in Prague-West District